Ludo De Witte (born 1956) is a Belgian writer and political activist internationally known for his book The assassination of Lumumba, on the murder of Patrice Lumumba. In his latest work, Als de laatste boom geveld is, eten we ons geld wel op: kapitalisme versus de aarde, De Witte promotes eco-socialism, stating that to save the world from ecocide, it and its people must be freed from the yoke of capitalism. De Witte also advocates a close cooperation between red and green in their mutual anti-capitalistic fight to save the planet from its demise.

Works

 
 
 Wie is bang voor moslims? Aantekeningen over Dyab Abou Jahjah, etnocentrisme en islamofobie (2004)
 Huurlingen, geheim agenten en diplomaten (Van Halewyck, 2014)
 Als de laatste boom geveld is, eten we ons geld wel op: kapitalisme versus de aarde (EPO, 2017)
 Moord in Burundi: België en de liquidatie van premier Louis Rwagasore (OEP, 2021)

References

Living people
1956 births